Postal codes in Brunei are known as postcodes and they are alphanumeric, consisting of two letters followed by four digits. Postcodes in Brunei are issued by the Postal Services Department, a government department under the Ministry of Communications.

Formatting 
A Bruneian postcode has six characters, consisting of two uppercase letters and immediately followed by four digits. Examples of postcodes are "BB3713" which represents the postcode area Anggerek Desa; "KB4533" which represents Panaga; and "BA2110" which represents Jabatan Hal Ehwal Masjid or the Department of Mosque Affairs.

Allocation 
The components of a postcode comprises four types of codes representing districts, mukims (subdistricts), villages and post offices.

Districts 
The first letter denotes the district code, which corresponds to the districts of Brunei.

Mukims 
The second letter denotes the mukim code, corresponding directly to the mukims or subdistricts of Brunei, the country's second-level administrative divisions.

Villages 
The first two digits after the two letters represent the village code. Usually, it corresponds directly to the villages, the country's third- and lowest-level administrative divisions. However, a few villages may have more than one postcode areas. Some postcode areas may also represent defunct villages or villages which have been subsumed under other nearby villages.

Post offices 
The last two digits represent the post office code, which generally correspond to the post office of, or nearest to, the village or mukim. A few may also correspond to the function of the place, and this exclusively refers to government ministries or departments. They have postcodes with the last digit "0" (such as from the above example "BA2110", which represents the Department of Mosque Affairs, a government department under the Ministry of Religious Affairs).

Postcodes 
A complete postcode represents either an area or a government agency.

Area postcode 
An area postcode is usually equivalent to the village subdivision – the postcode "TB1741" corresponds directly the whole area which constitutes Sinaut, a village in Tutong District. However, a few postcodes may represent specific parts of a village. For example, although the postcode for Rataie, a village in Temburong District, is "PE2751", the areas in it which constitute the Rancangan Perpindahan Negara- and Skim Tanah Kurnia Rakyat Jati-type public housing have separate postcodes of "PE2951" and "PE3151" respectively.

Some postcodes may also represent defunct villages and villages which have been subsumed other nearby villages. Bangar, the town of Temburong District, is also a village subdivision. However, it has two postcodes: "PA1151" and "PE1351", which constitute the postcode areas "Pekan Bangar Lama" and "Pekan Bangar" respectively. This means that the Bangar area once had two separate village subdivisions but have since been combined into the current Bangar subdivision.

A few postcodes may represent areas that are officially village subdivisions but are not sufficiently functioning as such. For example, "BB2513" represents the Old Airport Area, mainly an administrative area where many government departments are located.

Government postcode 
A few postcodes are exclusively for government agencies instead of areas. All postcodes with the last digit "0" constitute government ministries or departments. However, not all of them have dedicated postcodes, that is having "0" as their last digit – some still use the postcodes of the areas where they are located. For example, Jabatan Laut (Marine Department) uses the postcode "BT1728", which is also the postcode for Serasa, the village where the department is located.

Examples

See also 
 List of postcodes in Brunei
 Brunei Postal Services Department

References

External links 
 Postcode finder | Brunei Postal Services Department
 Brunei Postal Services Department

Brunei
Postal system of Brunei